Rockbank railway station is located on the Serviceton line in Victoria, Australia. It serves the western Melbourne suburb of Rockbank, and opened on 2 April 1884 as Mount Atkinson. It was renamed Rockbank in November 1889.

History
The station opened as Mount Atkinson on 2 April 1884, at the same time as the Serviceton line through it, and was renamed Rockbank in 1889. Being on a single track railway line, it provided a crossing loop for trains, and continued to do so until 2019. By 1914, it had a three-road yard, a passenger platform on the southern track, a goods platform on the northern track, and an interlocked signal box. The station served the local farming community. With a chaff mill established in the 1890s, and the recreation reserve and tennis club located nearby, the station became the focus of the Rockbank community.

In 1960, the crossing loop was extended for longer trains of up to 730 metres, and a short platform was provided on the loop road. In 1976, Centralised Traffic Control was provided on the line from Sunshine to Rockbank. Also in that year, flashing light signals were provided at the Leakes Road level crossing, located nearby in the up direction of the station. By the 1970s, the mill was disused, and the station building was demolished circa 1985. In 1986, the yard was rationalised to a main line and crossing loop and, in 1990, the mechanical signals and points were removed, and replaced by remotely controlled signalling, operated from the Bacchus Marsh signal box. The former northern platform (was Platform 2, now Platform 1) was not provided until 1992, replacing the former short platform.

In 2002, boom barriers were provided at the Leakes Road level crossing. In 2005, control of the signals was transferred to the Ballarat signal box, as part of the Regional Fast Rail project.

In March 2018, as part of the Regional Rail Revival project, work began on the reconstruction of the station. The two side platforms were completely rebuilt to fit six-carriage VLocity trains, and an accessible pedestrian overpass was installed over the tracks, accessed by lifts, ramps and stairs. The upgraded station had a new sealed car park for over 350 cars, new bus and taxi bays, secure bike storage areas, and drop-off zones. On 26 August 2019, the rebuilt station was opened to passengers. The project also involved 18km of duplication of track between Deer Park West and Melton. It was provided in late 2019, coinciding with the opening of Cobblebank.

First announced by the Andrews State Government in 2018, the station is set to be integrated into the metropolitan railway network, as part of the Western Rail Plan.

Platforms and services
Rockbank has two side platforms. It is served by V/Line Ballarat and Ararat line trains.

Platform 1:
  services to Southern Cross
  services to Southern Cross

Platform 2:
  services to Melton, Bacchus Marsh and Wendouree
  services to Ararat

Transport links
Transit Systems Victoria operates two routes via Rockbank station, under contract to Public Transport Victoria:
 : to Aintree
 : Sunshine station – Woodgrove Shopping Centre (Melton)

References

External links
 
 Rail Geelong gallery
 Victorian Railway Stations gallery
 Melway map at street-directory.com.au

Railway stations in Melbourne
Railway stations in Australia opened in 1884
Railway stations in the City of Melton